Li Jinlan (born 14 February  1967) is a Chinese former swimmer who competed in the 1984 Summer Olympics.

References

1967 births
Living people
Chinese female butterfly swimmers
Olympic swimmers of China
Swimmers at the 1984 Summer Olympics
Place of birth missing (living people)
20th-century Chinese women